Mineral County Schools is the operating school district within Mineral County, West Virginia. The district is governed by the Mineral County Board of Education. The superintendent for Mineral County Schools is Troy Ravenscroft M.Ed. Ravenscroft became superintendent July 2019.Kelli Wilson is the Assistant Superintendent. The Board of Education members are Lara Courrier (President), Mary Jane Baniak (Vice-President), Thomas Denne, Terry Puffinburger, and Donald Ashby Jr.

Mission

Success for all students - no exceptions, no excuses.  

Vision

The vision of the school system is to inspire students to become high achieving, creative, lifelong learners and productive, caring, responsible, American citizens.

Schools

Vocational schools
Mineral County Technical Center

High schools
Frankfort High School 
Keyser High School

Middle schools
Frankfort Middle School 
Keyser Middle School

Intermediate school
Frankfort Intermediate School

Elementary school
Frankfort Elementary School (Opening 2024-2025 School Year)

Primary schools
Burlington Primary School 
Fort Ashby Primary School 
Fountain Primary School 
New Creek Primary School 
Wiley Ford Primary School 
 Elk Garden Primary School

Keyser Primary School

Schools no longer in operation
Cross Elementary School
Elk Garden High School
Fort Ashby High School
Fort Ashby Middle School
Piedmont High School
Ridgeley High School
Ridgeley Middle School
Ridgeley Primary School
Short Gap Primary School

External links
Mineral County Schools

Mineral County Schools Facebook

Mineral County Schools Twitter

Mineral County Schools App Google Play

 Mineral County Schools App Store

School districts in West Virginia
Education in Mineral County, West Virginia